L.S. Ayres Annex Warehouse, also known as Elliott's Block Nos. 14-22, is a historic warehouse building located at Indianapolis, Indiana.  It was built in 1875 by the L.S. Ayres department store, and is a three-story, rectangular Italianate style brick building with an elaborate cast iron first story storefront. Other decorative elements are in stone, brick, and sheet metal.  It measures 72 feet, 6 inches, wide and 49 feet, 6 inches, deep.  It features Corinthian order columns as part of the cast iron facade.

It was listed on the National Register of Historic Places in 1973.

References

Commercial buildings on the National Register of Historic Places in Indiana
Italianate architecture in Indiana
Commercial buildings completed in 1875
Commercial buildings in Indianapolis
National Register of Historic Places in Indianapolis